"Nothing Ever Happened" is a song by Atlanta-based indie rock band Deerhunter. It is the first and only single released from Microcastle. The single was released on October 14, 2008. It came backed with a demo of another Microcastle track, "Little Kids" recorded during summer 2007. When playing the track live the band will usually improvise the last section for an extended time, with the song length exceeding anywhere from eight to twenty minutes, as heard when the group played a free show at Pier 54.

Pitchfork Media named the song the 6th best song of 2008 and 81st best song of the decade. On the track they commented: "[Bradford] Cox's terrors are buried deep inside, and to the degree he's able to access them, they're released with hushed, uncomplicated passion that finds the perfect fit between Poe, post-punk, and pot."

Track listing
 "Nothing Ever Happened" - 5:51
 "Little Kids" (Demo) - 4:10

References

2008 singles
Deerhunter songs
2008 songs